Holland's Got Talent 2019 is the tenth season of Holland's Got Talent and is broadcast on RTL 4 between 5 January 2019 to March 2019 presenter for this season is Humberto Tan the judges are  Dan Karaty, Chantal Janzen, Angela Groothuizen and Paul de Leeuw replaced Gordon Heuckeroth on the judging panel.

Semifinals summary

Semi-final rounds 
The semi-finals premiered on 16 February 2019 two acts will make it through to the grand final each week

Semi-final 1 (16 February 2019)

Semi-final 2 (23 February 2019)

Semi-final 3 (1 March 2019)

Semi-final 4 (8 March 2019)

Grand Final (15 March 2019)

References

Netherlands
2019 Dutch television seasons